Forres Mechanics Football Club are a senior Scottish association football club from the town of Forres, Moray, currently playing in the Highland Football League. They play at the town's Mosset Park. Forres Mechanics are the oldest association football club in the North of Scotland and are one of only two original teams to play in the Highland League since its first season in 1893, the other being Clachnacuddin.

History
Their unusual name is variously stated to come from the town's Mechanics Institute or most likely when a group of craftsmen or mechanics split from an earlier Forres team to form their own club. Forres Mechanics have won the Highland league twice: in the 1985–86 season and in the 2011–12 season.

On 26 November 2016, Forres Mechanics played their most high-profile match in recent years when they held League One side Stenhousemuir to a 2–2 draw in 2016–17 Scottish Cup, however they lost 3–1 in the replay.

Forres withdrew from the Highland League in the 2020–21 season, which was greatly affected by the Covid-19 pandemic.

Honours
 Highland Football League: 1985–86, 2011–12
 League Cup: 1946–47, 1954–55, 1984–85, 1998–99, 2000–01, 2001–02, 2009–10
 North of Scotland Cup: 1907–08, 1926–27, 1935–35, 1957–58, 1966–67, 1986–87, 2004–05, 2010–11
 Inverness Cup: 1985–86, 1989–90, 2005–06
 Scottish Qualifying Cup (North): 1963–64
 Scottish Supplementary Cup (North): 1954–55
 Elgin District Cup: 1892–93, 1893–94, 1894–95, 1899–1900, 1900–01, 1904–05, 1908–09, 1910–11, 1911–12, 1926–27, 1932–33, 1933–34
 Elginshire Charity Cup: 1901–02, 1902–03, 1907–08, 1908–09, 1910–11, 1911–12, 1912–13

Management
 Manager: Steven MacDonald
 Assistant Manager: Steven MacLean
 Coach: Fraser Bremner

References

External links
 Official website

 
Football clubs in Scotland
Highland Football League teams
Association football clubs established in 1884
1884 establishments in Scotland
Football in Moray
Forres
Works association football teams in Scotland